Juan Manuel Cerúndolo (born 15 November 2001) is an Argentine professional tennis player. He has won one ATP singles title.

Cerúndolo has a career high ATP singles ranking of world No. 79, achieved on 31 January 2022. He also has a career high ATP doubles ranking of No. 376 achieved on 3 February 2020.

Professional career

2021: First ATP title, three Challengers titles, top 100 and NextGen finals debut 

Cerúndolo made his ATP main draw debut at the 2021 Córdoba Open where, as a qualifier, he won the title. The world No. 335 was the fifth lowest ranked player to win an ATP Tour title since 1990 and the youngest Argentine tennis player to reach an ATP final since José Acasuso in 2001 and win an ATP tournament since Guillermo Coria in 2001, and the first player to win a title in his debut ATP event since Santiago Ventura in 2004.

In May 2021, Juan Manuel won his first challenger title on clay in an all-teenage final at the 2021 Garden Open II Challenger in Rome. He was the youngest Argentine champion on the ATP Challenger Tour in 12 years since Federico Delbonis and the first player to win on both tours in the same season since 2019. As a result, he reached a career-high ranking of World No. 152 in singles on 3 May 2021 and 2 weeks later entered the top 150 at No. 146.

In August and September, he won his second and third Challengers in Como, Italy and Benja Luka, Bosnia and Herzegovina.
He made his debut in the top 100 after a semifinal showing at the Challenger in Buenos Aires at World No. 94 on 25 October 2021 becoming only the fourth teenager to crack the top 100 rankings in 2021. He is the first from the South American nation to be in the Top 100 while under the age of 20 since Juan Martín del Potro in 2006. In addition, Cerundolo is only the seventh Argentine teen to reach the Top 100 since 1990, along with 18-year-olds Del Potro, José Acasuso and Guillermo Coria and 19-year-olds David Nalbandian, Mariano Puerta and Mariano Zabaleta.

After Félix Auger-Aliassime withdrew from the 2021 Next Generation ATP Finals, the ATP announced Cerúndolo as the next qualifier on 1 November 2021. He was the first player from South America to qualify in the tournament's history.

In his Next Gen ATP finals debut, Cerúndolo lost to fourth seed Brandon Nakashima in his first match. He then was defeated by seventh seed Holger Vitus Nodskov Rune. His third and final match ended in defeat to the tournament's top seed Carlos Alcaraz.

2022: Major & top 80 debut, First Masters win, Injuries & hiatus, out of top 150
Cerúndolo made his Grand Slam debut at the 2022 Australian Open as a direct entry into the main draw where he lost to qualifier Tomáš Macháč. He reached the top 80 on 17 January 2022.
After suffering a leg injury that made him unable to defend his title at the Córdoba Open, he lost in the first round of both the 2022 Chile Open and the Indian Wells Open to Carlos Taberner and Jack Sock respectively.

At the 2022 Miami Open, Cerundolo reached the third round, getting past Dušan Lajović and former top-10 player Kevin Anderson, after top-10 player Matteo Berrettini withdrew from the tournament. He was defeated by Frances Tiafoe. He did not play in any of the ATP tournaments on clay due to leg and hip injuries and as result dropped out of the top 130 to No. 132 on 16 May 2022. He also skipped the entire grass season including Wimbledon and the North American tournaments including the US Open.
When he returned later in September, he triumphed at the Buenos Aires and Coquimbo Challengers.

2023: Sixth Challenger title, back to top 105
He won the 2023 Challenger de Tigre in Argentina defeating Bolivian Murkel Dellien.

In Córdoba, Argentina he received a wildcard and defeated fellow Argentine and top seed Diego Schwartzman to reach the quarterfinals. With the victory, he improved to 10-0 at this ATP 250 (including his three qualifying wins in 2021).
At the 2023 Rio Open he qualified but lost to eventual champion Cam Norrie.
In Santiago he also qualified into the main draw and defeated Pedro Cachin in the first round.

Personal life
Cerúndolo is the younger brother of fellow tennis player, Francisco. In 2021 the brothers became the first to reach back-to-back finals on the ATP Tour since 2017, when Alexander Zverev won the title in Rome and Mischa Zverev reached the final in Geneva.

ATP career finals

Singles: 1 (1 title)

Futures and Challenger Career Finals

Singles: 15 (9–6)

Doubles: 3 (1–2)

Performance timelines

Singles
Current through the 2022 French Open.

Record against top 10 players
JM Cerúndolo's record against players who have been ranked in the top 10, with those who are active in boldface. Only ATP Tour main draw matches are considered:

References

External links
 
 

2001 births
Living people
Argentine male tennis players
Tennis players from Buenos Aires